The Massachusetts Department of Transportation (MassDOT) oversees roads, public transit, aeronautics, and transportation licensing and registration in the US state of Massachusetts.  It was created on November 1, 2009, by the 186th Session of the Massachusetts General Court upon enactment of the 2009 Transportation Reform Act.

History

In 2009, Governor Deval Patrick proposed merging all Massachusetts transportation agencies into a single Department of Transportation. Legislation consolidating all of Massachusetts' transportation agencies into one organization was signed into law on June 26, 2009.  The newly established Massachusetts Department of Transportation (MASSDOT) assumed operations from the existing conglomeration of state transportation agencies on November 1, 2009.

This change included:
 Creating the Highway Division from the former Massachusetts Turnpike Authority and MassHighways.
 Assuming responsibility for the planning and oversight functions of the Executive Office of Transportation 
 Assuming the functions of both the Massachusetts Aeronautics Commission and the Registry of Motor Vehicles
 Replacement of the MBTA's board of directors with the DOT's board of directors and removal of the budget veto from the MBTA Advisory Board (of municipalities).
 Assuming responsibility for the Tobin Bridge from Massport.
 Assuming responsibility for non-pedestrian bridges from the Department of Conservation and Recreation.

E-ZPass scandal
In June 2018, The Boston Globe reported 467 current and former Massachusetts Department of Transportation employees were using the E-ZPass transponders for free. This employee benefit that has been going on since at least 2009 costs the Massachusetts taxpayers approximately $1 million per year. It is not clear if MassDOT has paid taxes on the benefit or reported it to the Internal Revenue Service, or who would be responsible if a payment to the IRS is required.

Organization

As an executive department, the Governor of Massachusetts appoints the state Secretary of Transportation, who is also the "chief executive officer" of the Department.  The governor also appoints a five-person board of directors which approves major decisions.  The Department directly administers some operations, while others remain semi-autonomous.

Highway Division
 Made up of the former state entities MassHighway and the Massachusetts Turnpike Authority
 Interstate Highways, state highways, and the Massachusetts Turnpike. (Some portions of numbered state routes are owned and maintained by cities and towns.)
 Toll bridges and tunnels: the Tobin Bridge (transferred from MassPort on January 1, 2010), Sumner Tunnel, Callahan Tunnel, and Ted Williams Tunnel.
 All vehicular bridges in Department of Conservation and Recreation (DCR) parks are also either owned and maintained by DOT or scheduled to be transferred following completion of DCR work on them by the end of 2014. MassDOT took over the following urban roadways formerly under the DCR: McGrath and O'Brien Highways in Cambridge and Somerville, the Carroll Parkway portion of the Lynnway in Lynn, Middlesex Avenue in Medford, and Forest Hills Overpass ("Msgr. William Casey Highway overpass") (Jamaica Plain), Columbia Road (South Boston), Gallivan Boulevard (Dorchester), and Morton Street, all in Boston.

Registry of Motor Vehicles Division
Formerly an independent state entity, which until 1992 even had its own uniformed police force for vehicular traffic law enforcement, the Registry of Motor Vehicles Division is now directly administered by MassDOT.  It is the equivalent of the Department of Motor Vehicles in most states, and processes driver's licenses and motor vehicle registrations.

Mass Transit Division
All public transportation agencies are administered independently.  However, the DOT board of directors is also the board of directors for the Massachusetts Bay Transportation Authority, the major provider of public transportation in the Greater Boston area.

The remaining 15 public transit authorities are called Regional Transit Agencies (RTAs), and they provide public bus services in the remainder of the state. The regional transit authorities are:

The regional transit authorities shown in italics above are within MBTA's commuter rail service area, and provide connections to MBTA trains.

DOT retains oversight and statewide planning authority, and also has a Rail section within the Mass Transit Division.  Intercity passenger trains are operated by the federally owned Amtrak, and freight rail is privately operated.

MassDOT is a member of the Northeast Corridor Commission.

Aeronautics Division

The Aeronautics Division, formerly the Massachusetts Aeronautics Commission, administers state financing of its airports; inspects and licenses airports and landing pads; registers aircraft based in Massachusetts as well as aircraft dealers, regulates airport security, safety, and navigation; and is responsible for statewide aviation planning.  The Department of Transportation does not own any airports; the state-owned airports are controlled by the independent Massachusetts Port Authority (which shares its headquarters with the Aeronautics Division).

Government regulation of aviation in the United States is dominated by the Federal Aviation Administration.  Airline passenger and baggage screening is provided by the federal Transportation Security Administration, but airport security is provided locally.

Other groups

The 2009 reform law also created within MassDOT:

and outside DOT but supported by it:
 Public–Private Partnership Infrastructure Oversight Commission – an independent commission of 7 people, with 4 appointed by the governor, and one each appointed by the President of the Senate, Speaker of the House, and State Treasurer.

Other Massachusetts transportation agencies

Massachusetts Port Authority

The Massachusetts Port Authority (Massport) remains independent from the Department of Transportation, but the Secretary of Transportation serves on the Massport board of directors. Massport owns and operates the maritime Port of Boston, Boston's Logan International Airport, Hanscom Field and Worcester Regional Airport, which was transferred from the City of Worcester in 2010.

Steamship Authority

The Woods Hole, Martha's Vineyard and Nantucket Steamship Authority regulates all ferry services to and from the islands of Martha's Vineyard and Nantucket, and also operates its own passenger, vehicle, and freight ferries.  The Authority has an effective monopoly on car ferry service, but private companies operate various passenger routes.

State transportation funding

Transportation funding available to the state and its agencies include:

The statewide budget included $919 million for transportation in FY2009, not including $797M in sales tax revenue dedicated to the MBTA.

Local cities and towns also receive vehicle excise tax revenues, and levy property taxes.  Both state and municipal agencies can levy fines for parking and traffic violations.

Article 78 (LXXVIII) of the Massachusetts Constitution says all motor vehicle fees and taxes (except registration excise tax in lieu of property tax), including fuel taxes, must be spent on transportation, including roads, mass transit, traffic law enforcement, and administration.  Transportation is thus a net recipient of general state funds.

Capital planning
Massachusetts has 10 regional metropolitan planning organizations:

and three non-metropolitan planning organizations covering the remainder of the state:

By law, all federal transportation grants must be allocated by the responsible MPO. Statewide planning and coordination of MPOs is handled by the Department of Transportation.

CTPS is the Central Transportation Planning Staff, which is the staff of the Boston MPO and with which the MBTA contracts for planning assistance.

The Highway Division accepts submissions for projects from its district offices and municipalities.

Accelerated Bridge Program
The Accelerated Bridge Program is a bond bill signed into law by Governor Deval Patrick in August 2008, a year after the I-35W Mississippi River bridge collapse put the state's bridges in the spotlight. The $3 billion, 8-year accelerated bridge program will replace and rehabilitate around 270 bridges statewide. 300–500 additional bridges will be preserved to prevent further deterioration. As of September 1, 2015, the program has reduced the number of structurally deficient bridges to 408, from 543 in 2008.  The program is paid for using bonds in anticipation of future federal transportation grants to be issued to the state.

The MassDOT has called the Accelerated Bridge Program the "Laboratory of Innovation". Engineers on each project are invited to investigate other options to replace the bridges faster and more efficiently to reopen the bridges to traffic faster. Some of these options for the projects are:
 Design/build (e.g. I-495 Lowell)
 Prefabricated girders
 Prefabricated deck panels (e.g. I-495 Lowell)
 Prefabricated substructure
 Heavy lift of a slide-in bridge (e.g. Route 2 Phillipston)
 Float-in bridge (e.g. Craigie Drawbridge)
 Modular bridges (e.g. I-93 Medford)
 "Bridge in a backpack" was used to rebuild a bridge over the Scott Reservoir Outlet in Fitchburg for $890,480. With this technique, lightweight composite tubes are carried into place by several workers on foot (instead of by truck, crane, or heavy equipment) and then the weather-resistant tubes are filled with concrete.
 Bridges constructed in a single phase with traffic detoured (instead of a temporary bridge and multiple phases)

As of September 2015, there were 198 active or completed contracts, including replacement or repair of the following bridges (some of which span multiple contracts):
 Longfellow Bridge major overhaul – $267 million
 Fore River Bridge in Quincy – $245 million
 Fall River – Braga Bridge – $141 million
 Kenneth F. Burns Bridge over Lake Quinsigamond – $89 million rehab
 I-93 bridges in Medford – $74 million
 Casey Overpass – replacement with at-grade intersections – $40 million
 Craigie Drawbridge replacement – $40 million
 Lowell – Replacement of six bridges along I-495 – $34 million
 Neponset River Bridge carrying Route 3A (phase 2 only) – $34 million
 Anderson Memorial Bridge rehab – $20 million
 Boston University Bridge rehab – $18 million
 McCarthy Overpass of the McGrath Highway temporary repairs – $11 million
 Westminster – Route 2 over Route 140 bridge replacement – $11 million
 Storrow Drive Tunnel rehab – $10 million
 Bowker Overpass rehab – $6 million

References

Further reading 
 . (Various documents)

See also 
Massachusetts State Highway System

External links
 Official website
 Chapter 25 of the Acts of 2009 / AN ACT MODERNIZING THE TRANSPORTATION SYSTEMS OF THE COMMONWEALTH
 Massachusetts Association of Regional Transit Authorities
 GoTime - Official MassDOT travel app
 Seeing Red: A Boston Globe Spotlight report on Boston's crippling traffic

 
Transportation
Department of Transportation
State departments of transportation of the United States
Motor vehicle registration agencies
2009 establishments in Massachusetts
Toll road authorities of the United States